Federico Mattiello (born 14 July 1995) is an Italian professional footballer who plays as a defender for Dutch Eredivisie club Go Ahead Eagles.

Club career

Juventus
Born in Lucca, Mattiello joined the Juventus youth system as a 13-year-old after impressing in the youth squads of Lucchese, where he had played for four seasons; he had previously also played for Valdottavo. He was also a talented junior tennis player at the time, but chose to concentrate on football instead. He won the Coppa Italia and Supercoppa with the Juventus Primavera side in 2013.

On 9 November 2014, Mattiello made his debut for the first team, coming on as a late second-half substitute for fellow youth product Claudio Marchisio in the 7–0 thrashing of Parma. He was sent to Chievo Verona on loan in February 2015 to gain more playing time, but his loan spell was cut short when Radja Nainggolan broke his leg in the club's game against Roma on 8 March, and he was ruled out for the rest of the season. On 3 July 2015, an agreement was reached between Juventus and Chievo, that would see Mattiello's loan with the latter club renewed for the following season. He returned to action on 19 October, starting in a 3–2 home loss to Genoa. Three days later, however, he suffered another serious injury in training. In July 2017, Mattiello was loaned out to S.P.A.L. for the 2017–18 season.

Atalanta and loans
On 31 January 2018, Mattiello was signed by Atalanta, who agreed to keep him on loan with S.P.A.L. until the end of the season. On 20 July 2018, Mattiello joined Bologna on loan from Atalanta until 30 June 2019. On 23 September, he scored the first goal of his career, the opener in a 2–0 home win over Roma in the league. On 10 July 2019, Mattiello was loaned out to Cagliari. On 15 September 2020, he joined Spezia. On 31 January 2022, Mattiello was loaned to Alessandria. On 1 September 2022, Mattiello's contract with Atalanta was terminated by mutual consent.

Go Ahead Eagles
On 5 September 2022, after having been released from his Atalanta contract, Mattiello signed a contract with Dutch Eredivisie club Go Ahead Eagles until the end of the 2022–23 season.

International career
Since 2010, Mattiello has made 18 appearances for Italy at youth level; he managed six appearances and one goal with the Under-16 team (which came against Ukraine on 16 October 2010), eight appearances with the Under-17 side, and four with the Under-20 side.

Style of play
Once considered to be one of the most promising young Italian players in his position in the media, Mattiello is capable of playing as a full-back or winger on either flank.

Career statistics

Honours

Club
Juventus
Primavera
 Coppa Italia Primavera: 2012–13
 Supercoppa Primavera: 2013

First team
 Serie A: 2014–15,2016–17
 Coppa Italia: 2014–15, 2016–17

Individual
 MVP of Al Kass International Cup U-17: January 2012

References

External links
 Profile at LegaSerieA.it 
 Profile at FIGC.it  

1995 births
Living people
Italian footballers
Italy youth international footballers
Association football midfielders
Serie A players
Juventus F.C. players
A.C. ChievoVerona players
S.P.A.L. players
Atalanta B.C. players
Bologna F.C. 1909 players
Cagliari Calcio players
Spezia Calcio players
U.S. Alessandria Calcio 1912 players
Go Ahead Eagles players
Eredivisie players
People from Barga, Tuscany
Sportspeople from the Province of Lucca
Footballers from Tuscany